Strawberry Lane is a 2014 Philippine television drama series broadcast by GMA Network. It premiered on the network's Telebabad line up from September 15, 2014 to January 2, 2015, replacing Niño.

Mega Manila ratings are provided by AGB Nielsen Philippines.

Series overview

Episodes

September 2014

October 2014

November 2014

December 2014

January 2015

References

Lists of Philippine drama television series episodes